Rear Admiral Roy Milton Davenport (June 18, 1909 – December 24, 1987) was an officer in the United States Navy. He is the first sailor to be awarded five Navy Crosses, the United States military's second highest decoration for valor. Davenport was awarded these military decorations while serving as a submarine commander in the Pacific during World War II.

Davenport made eleven submarine war patrols, six of them as a commanding officer. It was during these six patrols in command of the Gato-class submarines  and  that he received five Navy Crosses, two Silver Stars, two Navy and Marine Corps Commendation Medals, two Presidential Unit Citations, Combat Action Ribbon, and the Navy Unit Commendation. He was also awarded the Submarine Combat Patrol Insignia with two silver star devices for a total of eleven successful war patrols. These are documented in his autobiography, Clean Sweep, 1986.

A student of Christian Science, Davenport was dubbed the "praying skipper" and was known for his daring attacks against Japanese ships, often executed on the surface to gain additional speed. In all, he was credited during the Pacific War with sinking 17 Japanese ships and damaging 10, but this was reduced to 8 by JANAC postwar evaluations. While none of the men under his command were lost, he and his crews experienced many close calls and escapes. He credited his religious faith for his successes.

Early life and family 
Davenport was born in Kansas City, Kansas, and grew up in the Midwest. In June 1933, he graduated from the United States Naval Academy as an ensign. In 1935, he married Jane Andre Gorham, who would be his wife for 52 years; together they had two daughters, Delia (Davenport) Gruenig and Bonnie (Davenport) Byhre.

Naval career
Davenport's first naval assignment was on the battleship . The next year he attended Submarine School in New London, Connecticut. Upon graduation he was temporarily assigned to the training ship  until the  arrived on the East Coast to be re-engined. After some time in Panama, he arrived in Pearl Harbor in June 1939.

Outbreak of World War II
After four patrols aboard, Burlingame recommended Davenport for a command of his own.

Beyond the expected and usual depth charging after attacks on ships, there were close escapes. Once, a Japanese airplane dropped three bombs directly on the Silversides. The sub survived; although during escape, it went into a hard dive with bow planes jammed, exceeding its design depth. At the last moment, Exec Davenport removed a cotter key, enabling the sub to level off to avoid being crushed. On another occasion, a torpedo, half stuck in the firing chamber required re-firing. If unsuccessfully re-fired, it could have sunk the sub. Another time, Davenport had to wrestle a pistol from a drunken gunner's mate who felt that he had been robbed in a dice game. The sailor was removed from the sub in a straitjacket.

USS Haddock
Haddock achieved three successful patrols; Davenport's first patrol in command was off the Palau Islands,  sinking two confirmed ships, Toyo Maru and Arima Maru, for 9,200 tons. His wartime credit was one for 11,900. After 39 days at sea, Haddock went in for extensive refit to repair a defective, potentially lethal, conning tower. At a depth of 415 feet, it had almost imploded. To close the hatch to save the boat from sinking, Davenport hit the hatch with a sledgehammer. The conning tower held, and Haddock escaped.

Credited with one ship sunk for 10,900 tons and damage to another for 35,000 tons, he was awarded his first Navy Cross; this score was later corrected to one ship sunk at 5,500 tons.

In August 1943, Davenport was dispatched to Truk, making a 27-day patrol that would earn him a second Navy Cross. He fired four torpedoes on a ship on September 15, claiming two hits and fire aboard the target, which nevertheless tried to ram, leading Davenport to fire two more "down the throat". For his third patrol, he was credited with three ships sunk, a total of 39,200 tons.

The freighter was claimed to have sunk immediately, the troopship to have caught fire then settle. The stern shots all missed, but Davenport reported hits in both tankers. After reloading, he fired two more torpedoes at each, claiming both tankers sunk. The second Truk patrol earned Davenport credit for five ships and 32,600 tons, including the escort, plus damage to one for 4,000 tons. None were confirmed by postwar JANAC, while Davenport, backed by his executive officers, believe the Japanese attempted to deceive the Allies into thinking the tankers remained in service.

USS Trepang

Afterward, "at his own request", Davenport was detached for a rest and new construction, and "Beetle" Roach was given Haddock. Davenport would return to duty with the new Balao-class . On September 30, 1944 off Honshu, Davenport fired six torpedoes on two large tankers, a large freighter, and an escort, claiming a hit in one tanker; JANAC confirmed only sinking of a 750-ton freighter, Taknuan Maru.

Davenport weathered a typhoon and, on October 10/11, picked up a convoy of two tankers and one escort. Firing four stern tubes, he claimed three hits. No sinkings were confirmed in Japanese records. The next night, he fired four torpedoes at a Japanese landing craft, believing all missed. Postwar, he was credited with the 1,000 ton Transport No. 5. He fired all six bow tubes at one "battleship". He claimed hits in one destroyer, suggesting it sank immediately, and at least one hit in the first "battleship". He then swung and fired all four stern tubes, his last remaining torpedoes, at the other "battleship"; all missed. Back in Majuro, he was credited with three ships of 22,300 tons and damage to a Yamashiro-class battleship for 29,300 tons, earning him a fourth Navy Cross.

On his next patrol to Luzon Strait, Davenport led a "wolfpack" called "Roy's Rangers" consisting of Trepang, James Fulp's Segundo, and Charles Brown's Razorback He fired twenty-two torpedoes in all, claiming four ships for 35,000 tons; this was reduced postwar to three for 13,000.

Later career and retirement
After completing this, his tenth war patrol, in December 1944, Davenport requested shore duty, and became a maritime engineering instructor at Annapolis. Except for those who earned the Medal of Honor, such as Dick O'Kane, he was the Submarine Force's most decorated member.

Davenport remained in the Navy after the war and saw "in theater" service during the Korean War. His last assignment was as commanding officer of the troop transport  from 1958 to August 1959 after which he retired from the navy after 26 years of service. Upon retirement, he was promoted to rear admiral in recognition of his combat decorations.

Davenport died on Christmas Eve 1987 at the age of 78.

Television appearance
In 1954, the popular television program, This Is Your Life with host Ralph Edwards, recounted his wartime events with close family appearing with him. Davenport's cousin, General Maxwell D. Taylor, the Chairman of the Joint Chiefs of Staff under President John F. Kennedy, did not appear as only immediate family and those who interacted in Davenport's wartime adventures, were invited.

Military awards and decorations

Navy Cross citations

First

Second

Third

Fourth

Fifth

See also
Samuel David Dealey
Eugene B. Fluckey
Chesty Puller

Notes

References
 Blair, Clay, Jr. Silent Victory. New York: Bantam, 1976 (reprints 1975 Lippincott edition).
 
 Trapang, Dictionary of American Naval Fighting Ships 7: 269–270, 1981.  Describes Davenport's actions that resulted in his fourth and fifth Navy Cross awards.
 Hoyt, Edwin P., Now Here This, The Story of American Sailors in World War II, Paragon House, 1993.
 Davenport, Roy M. Clean Sweep, Vantage Press, New York, 1986

External links

Home of Heroes
American Military Decorations & Awards Research Institute
USS Haddock, Dictionary of American Naval Fighting Ships.  Details World War II actions of the USS Haddock, commanded by LCDR Davenport.

1909 births
1987 deaths
United States Navy personnel of World War II
Recipients of the Navy Cross (United States)
Recipients of the Silver Star
United States Navy rear admirals
United States submarine commanders